Francis Harold Scarfe (1911–1986) was an English poet, critic and novelist, who became an academic, translator and Director of the British Institute in Paris.

He was born in South Shields; he was brought up from a young age at the Royal Merchant Seaman's Orphanage. He was educated at Armstrong College in Newcastle, which was then part of Durham University, where he earned a Bachelor of Arts degree in 1933. He also studied at Fitzwilliam College, Cambridge and at the Sorbonne.

While in Paris he wrote surrealist verse, and dabbled in communism, from which he then retreated. He taught at the University of Glasgow briefly before the outbreak of World War II, in which he worked in the British Army's Education Corps. He was posted to Orkney, and the Faroe Islands. While in Orkney he lodged with the family of the young George Mackay Brown, on whom he was a major influence.

His book from 1942 was one of the first to engage critically with the Auden Group, if superficially; he returned to Auden in a post-war book of greater depth. After the war he held a number of academic positions.

Works

Inscapes (1940) poems
Forty Poems and Ballads (1941)
Auden & After: The Liberation Of Poetry, 1930-41 (1942) criticism
Promises (?) first novel
W. H. Auden (1948) criticism
Underworlds (1950) poems
Single Blessedness (1951) novel
The Unfinished Woman (1954) novel
The Art of Paul Valéry (1954)
Picasso by  Frank Elgar and Robert Maillard (1956) translator
Baudelaire (1961, Penguin Books) editor
Conversations on the Dresden Gallery, by Louis Aragon and Jean Cocteau (1982) translator
Complete Verse of  Charles P. Baudelaire (1986 Anvil Press Poetry) translator
Baudelaire: the Poems in Prose (1989, Anvil Press Poetry) translator

References

English literary critics
Alumni of Fitzwilliam College, Cambridge
University of Paris alumni
1911 births
1986 deaths
20th-century English novelists
20th-century English poets
Alumni of Armstrong College, Durham
People from South Shields
Writers from Tyne and Wear